Ravinder Kumar Molhu (born Ravinder Kumar) is an Indian politician and member of the 15th and the 16th Legislative assemblies of Uttar Pradesh. Molhu is a member of the Bahujan Samaj Party and represented Rampur Maniharan constituency of Uttar Pradesh during the Sixteenth Legislative Assembly of Uttar Pradesh.

Early life and education
Ravinder Kumar Molhu  was born in the village Hasanpur, Saharanpur district, India in 1969. His highest attained education is high school. Molhu belongs to the SC category and belongs to chamar community. Prior to entering politics, he was an agriculturist by profession.

Political career
Ravinder Kumar Molhu has been a MLA for two straight terms (since 2007). During his first term, he contested from Nagal (Assembly constituency) (ceased to exist after "Delimitation of Parliamentary and Assembly Constituencies Order, 2008"). He currently represents Rampur Maniharan (Assembly constituency) and is a member of the Bahujan Samaj Party.

In Seventeenth Legislative Assembly of Uttar Pradesh 2017 he lost to Bhartiya Janata Party candidate Devendra Kumar Nim by a margin of 595 votes.

Posts held

See also

 Rampur Maniharan
 Uttar Pradesh Legislative Assembly
 16th Legislative Assembly of Uttar Pradesh
 15th Legislative Assembly of Uttar Pradesh
 Politics of India
 Bahujan Samaj Party

References

People from Saharanpur district
1969 births
Bahujan Samaj Party politicians from Uttar Pradesh
Living people
Uttar Pradesh MLAs 2007–2012
Uttar Pradesh MLAs 2012–2017
Uttar Pradesh politicians
Bharatiya Janata Party politicians from Uttar Pradesh